This article lists the winners and nominees for the NAACP Image Award for Outstanding Supporting Actor in a Motion Picture. The award was introduced in 1970 and was awarded sporadically until its permanent feature from 1995 onwards. Morgan Freeman and Denzel Washington currently hold the record for most wins in this category, with four each.

Winners and nominees
For each year in the tables below, the winner is listed first and highlighted in bold.

1970s

1980s

1990s

2000s

2010s

2020s

Multiple wins and nominations

Wins

 4 wins
 Morgan Freeman
 Denzel Washington

 3 wins
 Samuel L. Jackson

 2 wins
 Terrence Howard

Nominations

 8 nominations
 Don Cheadle

 5 nominations
 Morgan Freeman
 Denzel Washington
 Forest Whitaker

 4 nominations
 Cedric the Entertainer
 Charles S. Dutton
 Idris Elba
 Danny Glover
 Terrence Howard

 3 nominations
 Anthony Anderson
 Chiwetel Ejiofor
 Cuba Gooding Jr.
 Samuel L. Jackson
 Delroy Lindo
 David Oyelowo

 2 nominations
 Mahershala Ali
 Chadwick Boseman
 Mos Def
 Jamie Foxx
 Aldis Hodge 
 Djimon Hounsou
 Lenny Kravitz
 Anthony Mackie
 Blair Underwood
 Nate Parker
 Mario Van Peebles
 Ving Rhames
 Clarence Williams III

References

Film awards for supporting actor
NAACP Image Awards